The Sevenmile Mountains are a mountain range in central Gila County in the U.S. state of Arizona. The highest peak is labelled Seven on the USGS topo sheet and has a topographic isolation of 13.35 miles (21 km). The majority of the southern end of the range is located on the San Carlos Apache Indian Reservation. The high point and the northwestern tip of the range is in the Tonto National Forest and is open to free range hiking (hiking without any trails). The mountains' high point is located just 3 miles east from a section of the U.S. Route 60 in Arizona in between Globe, Arizona and Show Low, Arizona. The southern end of the range (which encompasses most of the entire range) that is inside the San Carlos Apache Indian Reservation should only be hiked with permission from the Reservation. The range is one of many that occur in the Arizona transition zone.

Location 
The nearest town/city is Globe, Arizona, approximately 17 miles to the southwest on U.S. Route 60.

Camping 
Approximately 3.6 miles west-southwest of the peak on US Route 60 is the Jones Water campground. Jones Water is a free primitive campground and offers only basic amenities.

References 

Mountain ranges of Gila County, Arizona
Arizona transition zone mountain ranges
Mountain ranges of Arizona